This is a list of airlines currently operating in Lebanon.

Scheduled airlines

See also

 List of airlines
 List of defunct airlines of Lebanon
 List of defunct airlines of Asia

References

Lebanon
Airlines
Airlines
Lebanon